Christopher Dietzen (born March 8, 1947) was an associate justice of the Minnesota Supreme Court from 2008 to 2016 and a judge of the Minnesota Court of Appeals from 2004 to 2008.

Early life and education
Dietzen was born on March 8, 1947, in Yakima, Washington. He attended Gonzaga University as an undergraduate and law student, receiving a Bachelor of Business Administration degree in 1969 and a Juris Doctor in 1973.

Career
Dietzen was an attorney with the law firm of Larkin, Hoffman, Daly & Lindren, Ltd., of Bloomington, Minnesota, from 1978 to 2004, and with the firm of Richter, Wimberly, & Ericson in Spokane, Washington, from 1973 to 1977. He also served as an attorney for Tim Pawlenty during his 2002 gubernatorial campaign.

Dietzen joined the Minnesota Supreme Court on February 19, 2008. He was appointed to the court by Pawlenty after the resignation of Justice Sam Hanson. From December 15, 2004, to February 19, 2008, he served as a judge on the Minnesota Court of Appeals. He was likewise appointed to that judgeship by Pawlenty and then elected to it in 2006.

In 2001 and 2004, Dietzen contributed $250 to the reelection campaign of Norm Coleman, with his last donation occurring almost a year before he became a judge.

Dietzen retired from the Supreme Court on August 31, 2016, seven months before reaching the mandatory retirement age.

References

1947 births
Living people
Politicians from Yakima, Washington
People from Bloomington, Minnesota
Gonzaga University alumni
Gonzaga University School of Law alumni
Justices of the Minnesota Supreme Court
Minnesota Court of Appeals judges